Ostropel is a typical Romanian stew that is primarily made from chicken mixed with a thick tomato sauce. Additionally, garlic or spring onions can be added to the dish. Rabbit, lamb, or other types of meat are also sometimes used and, alternatively, vegetarian versions can be made during fasting periods.

Origins 
Like some other dishes, this is among the Romanian foods with no equivalents abroad. Hence, it is seen as staple of traditional Romanian cuisine.

Preparation 
The dish is traditionally prepared by first frying chicken drumsticks or thighs. Afterwards, water is mixed with the cooking oil, tomato sauce, flour, garlic and onions until the sauce reaches a boiling point, at which point the chicken is added and left to boil for another fifteen minutes, or until the sauce gains a thick consistency. Before serving, parsley is sprinkled on top. Mămăligă (polenta) is typically used as a side dish, together with a light salad.

Variations 
Like many Romanian dishes, the ostropel has regional variations. For example, in Moldova the recipe is rather simple, without many other ingredients added to the sauce. However, in Oltenia carrots and vinegar are added to the sauce, and the final dish is served with boiled potatoes instead of mămăligă.

See also
 List of chicken dishes
 List of stews

References 

Romanian stews
Chicken dishes
Rabbit dishes